Willie Banks (born 1956) is an American track and field athlete.

Willie Banks may also refer to:
 Willie Banks (baseball) (born 1969), American baseball pitcher
 Willie Banks (American football) (1946–1989), American football offensive lineman
 Willie Banks (musician) (1929–1993), American musician
 Willie Banks (footballer), Scottish footballer

See also
 William Banks (disambiguation)